The Democratic People's Union (Bosnian: Demokratska narodna zajednica, DNZ) is a political party in Bosnia and Herzegovina. It was founded in 1993 and first led by Fikret Abdić.

In 2014 the Democratic People's Union saw a major split when large number of its members led by Elvira Abdić-Jelenović (Fikret's daughter) founded a new party, the Labour Party of Bosnia and Herzegovina. Due to this split, the DNZ now has only 2 out of 28 members of the Velika Kladuša Municipality Council, while the new Labour Party gained a large majority.

References

External links
Website of the political party

Bosniak political parties in Bosnia and Herzegovina
Velika Kladuša